Aili Vahtrapuu (born 26 January 1950) is an Estonian sculptor.

In 1980 she graduated from the Estonian State Art Institute. In 2007 Vahtrapuu was awarded a PhD by Sorbonne University. Vahtrapuu was a professor at Tallinn University in Estonia in 2009.

She is a member of Estonian Artists' Union.

Personal exhibitions
1993 Palee D’Orsay, Paris, France
1996 Draakoni Galerii, Tallinn
1996 Roma, Italy
1998 Analoog. Linnagalerii, Tallinn
1999 (with Jaan Elken), Kotka, Finland
1999 Vee Ruum. Tallinn Kunstihoone Galerii, Tallinn
2000 Eesti Rooste. Rock al Mare Vabaõhumuuseum, Tallinn
2000 Vee Ruum 3. Narva Kunstimuuseum, Narva
2001 Friedrich Linnupüüdja. Linnagalerii, Tallinn
2001 Passage Nordique. (with Kristiina Kaasik), L’Harmattani Galerii, Paris, France
2001/2002 Friedrich Linnupüüdja. Narva Kunstimuuseum, Narva
2002 Vee loomise lugu. Raegalerii, Kuressaare

References

1950 births
Living people
20th-century Estonian sculptors
Estonian Academy of Arts alumni